Hungarian Rhapsody No. 7, S.244/7, in D minor, is the seventh in a set of nineteen Hungarian Rhapsodies composed by Franz Liszt for solo piano.

Sources of the melodies 
The 7th Hungarian Rhapsody is based on three different melodies, all of which are found in the 15th number of Magyar Dalok, Volume VIII. The first is from a collection containing the tune Chlopitzky nótát, while the other two are authentic Hungarian folk songs, entitled Nincsen nékem kedvesebb vendégem and Nem láttam én télen fecskét.

References

External links
  (IMSLP)

07

Compositions in D minor